
This is a list of aircraft in numerical order of manufacturer followed by alphabetical order beginning with 'M'.

Mc

McBride 
(Kenneth O McBride, 408 W Sea Ave, Independence, MO)
 McBride M.1 Monoplane

McCain
(William A.McCain)
 McCain Swick-T

McCarley 
(Charles E McCarley, Hueytown, AL)
 McCarley Mini-Mac

McCarroll 
(Cadillac Aircraft Corp (consortium of Detroit businessmen; Pres: Inglis M. Uppercu, vp: H G McCarroll), Detroit, MI)
 McCarroll Duoplane
 McCarroll MAC-1

MCC Aviation
(Gandvaux, Switzerland)
MCC Amaya
MCC Arolla
MCC Beluga
MCC Boléa
MCC Insigia
MCC Maluga
MCC Orbea

McCarter 
(Edgar H McCarter, Union City, IN)
 McCarter S-A

McCarthy 
( (George L) McCarthy Aeronautical Engr Co, Lowell, MI)
 McCarthy Air Scout

McClary 
(Earl E McClary (also seen spelled McCleary), South Gate, CA)
 McClary A
 McClary B
 McClary D
 McClary D-1

McCook 
(McCook Aircraft Corp, McCook, NE)
 McCook Commercial

McCormick-James 
((Harold F) McCormick-(Sidney) James, Cicero, IL)
 McCormick-James 1910 Monoplane

McCormick-Romme 
((Harold F) McCormick-(William S) Romme, Cicero, IL)
 McCormick-Romme Umbrellaplane (several iterations)

McCulloch 
(McCulloch Aircraft Corp, 119 Standard St, El Segundo, CA)
 McCulloch J-2
 McCulloch 4E
 McCulloch MC-4
 McCulloch YH-30
 McCulloch XHUM-1

McCune 
(Elliott R McCune, Wallingford, CT)
 McCune Sport

McCurdy-Willard 
((John A D) McCurdy & (Charles F) Willard Aeroplane Co, Nassau Blvd Aerodrome, Long Island, NY, aircraft built by Queen Aeroplane Co, Bronx Park, NY)
 McCurdy-Willard Headless

McDaneld 
(D E McDaneld & Lloyd Royer, Arcadia, CA)
 McDaneld Roamair

McDaniel 
(Alden W McDaniel, Chevy Chase, MD)
 McDaniel 1930 Monoplane

McDaniel 
(Arthur McDaniels, Toledo, OH)
 McDaniels Model 2

McDonnell 
(McDonnell Aircraft)
 McDonnell F-2 Banshee
 McDonnell F-3 Demon
 McDonnell F-4 Phantom II
 McDonnell F-101 Voodoo
 McDonnell F-110 Spectre
 McDonnell XF-85 Goblin
 McDonnell F-88 Voodoo
 McDonnell AH
 McDonnell FD Phantom
 McDonnell FH Phantom
 McDonnell F2H Banshee
 McDonnell F3H Demon
 McDonnell F4H Phantom II
 McDonnell H-20 Little Henry
 McDonnell H-29
 McDonnell HCH (not built)
 McDonnell HJD Whirlaway
 McDonnell HJH Whirlaway
 McDonnell KDD Kadydid
 McDonnell TD2D Katydid
 McDonnell KSD Gargoyle
 McDonnell LBD Gargoyle
 McDonnell L-25
 McDonnell LBD Gargoyle
 McDonnell P-67 Bat
 McDonnell V-1 Jeep
 McDonnell 38
 McDonnell 79
 McDonnell 86
 McDonnell 113
 McDonnell 119
 McDonnell 220
 McDonnell 120 Flying Crane
 McDonnell 188
 McDonnell 220
 McDonnell CF-101 Voodoo – Canadian Armed Forces
 McDonnell Doodlebug

McDonnell Douglas 
 McDonnell Douglas Project Kahu
 McDonnell Douglas High Alpha Research Vehicle
 McDonnell Douglas A-4 Skyhawk
 McDonnell Douglas A-4G Skyhawk
 McDonnell Douglas A-4K Skyhawk
 McDonnell Douglas/Lockheed-Martin A-4AR Fightinghawk
 McDonnell Douglas/General Dynamics A-12 Avenger
 McDonnell Douglas A-12 Avenger II
 McDonnell Douglas AV-8B Harrier II
 McDonnell Douglas C-9 Nightingale
 McDonnell Douglas C-9 Skytrain II
 McDonnell Douglas/Boeing C-17 Globemaster III
 McDonnell Douglas KC-10 Extender
 McDonnell Douglas YC-15
 McDonnell Douglas AH-64 Apache
 McDonnell Douglas F-4 Phantom II
 McDonnell Douglas F-15 Eagle
 McDonnell Douglas F-15 STOL/MTD
 McDonnell Douglas F-15E Strike Eagle
 McDonnell Douglas F/A-18 Hornet
 McDonnell Douglas/British Aerospace AV-8B Harrier II
 McDonnell Douglas KC-10 Extender
 McDonnell Douglas T-45 Goshawk
 McDonnell Douglas X-36
 McDonnell Douglas DC-8
 McDonnell Douglas DC-9
 McDonnell Douglas DC-9 Super 80
 McDonnell Douglas DC-10
 McDonnell Douglas DC-10 Air Tanker
 McDonnell Douglas MD-10
 McDonnell Douglas MD-11
 McDonnell Douglas MD-12
 McDonnell Douglas MD-80
 McDonnell Douglas MD-81
 McDonnell Douglas MD-82
 McDonnell Douglas MD-83
 McDonnell Douglas MD-87
 McDonnell Douglas MD-88
 McDonnell Douglas MD-90
 McDonnell Douglas MD-94X
 McDonnell Douglas MD-95
 McDonnell Douglas CF-188 Hornet Canadian Armed Forces
 F/A-18E/F Super Hornet

McGaffey 
((Neill F) McGaffey Airplane Development Co, Inglewood, CA)
 McGaffey Aviate

McGill 
(Robert G McGill Aircraft Co, 661 Turk St, San Francisco, CA)
 McGill S

McGregor
(Wilmer McGregor, Hamilton, Ontario, Canada)
 McGregor MG-65

McGuiness 
(Pete McGuiness)
 McGuiness Windsong

McKellar 
(John D McKellar, California Polytechnic College, San Luis Obispo, CA)
 McKellar M-1

McKenzie 
(George Mckenzie)
 McKenzie Silver Wings

McKinnie 
(McKinnie Aircraft Co Ltd)
 McKinnie 165

McKinnon 
(McKinnon Enterprises Inc)
 McKinnon G-21C
 McKinnon G-21D
 McKinnon G-21E
 McKinnon G-21F
 McKinnon G-21G Turbo Goose
 McKinnon Super Widgeon
 McKinnon Turbo-Goose

McKissick 
()
 McKissick Viceroy

McLaughlin 
(M L McLaughlin, Iowa City, IA)
 McLaughlin Model A Skybuggy

McMahon 
(John F McMahon, New York, NY)
 McMahon Model T

McMechan 
(Maurice H McMechan, 110 N 5 Ave, Yakima, WA)
 McMechan AC-2
 McMechan 1936 aeroplane

McMullen 
((A B) McMullen Aircraft Corp/Aviation School, Tampa, FL)
 McMullen Mac Airliner
 McMullen MC-1
 McMullen MC-2

McNeal 
(Francis B McNeal, Hartington, NE)
 McNeal 21

McPherson 
(John Bayard McPherson IV, Old Welsh Rd, Abington, PA)
 McPherson Model 1

McRae 
(Walter C McRae, Grove City, MN)
 McRae 1927 Monoplane

McVean
(O & W McVean Ltd)
 McVean Valkyr V-2

McWethy 
(Walter C McRae, Grove City, MN)
 McWethy A-2

References

Further reading

External links 

 List of Aircraft (M)

fr:Liste des aéronefs (I-M)